Suur Munamägi (translation "Great Egg Mountain") is the highest peak in Estonia (and the Baltic states), reaching  above sea level. It is located near the village of Haanja, in Võru County in the south-eastern corner of Estonia, close to the borders of both Latvia and Russia. The landscape around the peak — the Haanja Upland — is gently hilly.

The Suur Munamägi Tower is located at the top of peak.

See also
Extreme points of Estonia

External links

 Suur Munamägi website
 Gallery of the tower

Hills of Estonia
Rõuge Parish
Landforms of Võru County
Tourist attractions in Võru County
Highest points of countries